The Mesmes language is an extinct West Gurage language, one of the Ethiopian Semitic languages spoken in Ethiopia. There are still many people who claim the Mesmes ethnic identity, but none who speak the language.  The last speaker of the language was interviewed by a language survey team when he was approximately 80 years old. He had not spoken the language for 30 years, having nobody to speak it with since his brother died.

The Mesmes have shifted to speaking the Hadiyya language. However, they still maintain some cultural distinctives, including their own style of  house architecture.

The comparative method has shown that the language is most closely related to the Inor variety of Gurage.

References 
Ahland, Michael Bryan. (2010). Language death in Mesmes. Dallas: SIL International and the University of Texas at Arlington.
Bustorf, Dirk. (2007). "Mäsmäs”, in: Siegbert Uhlig (ed.): Encyclopaedia Aethiopica, vol. 3: D-Ha, Wiesbaden: Harrassowitz Verlag, p. 838-39.

Notes 

Extinct languages of Africa
Languages of Ethiopia
Ethiopian Semitic languages